Visa requirements for Kuwaiti citizens are administrative entry restrictions by the authorities of other states placed on citizens of Kuwait. As of 13 April 2021, Kuwaiti citizens had visa-free or visa on arrival access to 96 countries and territories, ranking the Kuwaiti passport 55th in terms of travel freedom according to the Henley Passport Index.

Kuwaiti citizens do not need a visa to enter other member states of the GCC.

Visa requirements map

Visa requirements

Non-visa restrictions

See also

Visa policy of Kuwait
Kuwaiti passport

References and Notes
References

Notes

Kuwait
Foreign relations of Kuwait